Grimsby Town Football Club is a professional football club based in Cleethorpes, North East Lincolnshire, England, that competes in , the fourth tier of the English football league system, following the victory in the 2022 National League play-off Final. Nicknamed "the Mariners", the club was founded as Grimsby Pelham Football Club in 1878, changed its name to Grimsby Town a year later, and moved to its current stadium, Blundell Park, in 1898.

Grimsby Town is the most successful team of the three professional clubs in historic Lincolnshire, being the only one to play top-flight English football. It is also the only club of the three to reach an FA Cup semi-final (doing so on two occasions, both times during the 1930s). It has also spent more time in the English game's first and second tiers than any other club from Lincolnshire. Notable former managers include Bill Shankly, who went on to guide Liverpool to three League titles, two FA Cups and a UEFA Cup triumph, and Lawrie McMenemy who, after securing promotion to the then Third Division in 1972, moved to Southampton where he won the FA Cup in 1976. Alan Buckley is the club's most successful manager; he had three spells between 1988 and 2008, guiding the club to three promotions and two appearances at Wembley Stadium during the 1997–98 season, winning both the Football League Trophy and the Football League Second Division play-off Final. In 2008, Buckley took Grimsby to the capital again, but lost out to MK Dons in the final of the Football League Trophy. The Mariners had also reached the Football League Two play-off Final in 2006 at the Millennium Stadium in Cardiff, but lost the match 1–0 to Cheltenham Town, Later trips to Wembley in 2013 and 2016 saw them defeated in the FA Trophy final by Wrexham and F.C. Halifax Town respectively, having also lost at the venue in the 2015 National League play-off final to Bristol Rovers before finally gaining promotion by winning the 2016 final against Forest Green Rovers. Grimsby were again relegated out of the Football League in 2021, but secured an immediate promotion at the first attempt with victory over Solihull Moors in the 2022 National League play-off final at the London Stadium. On 1 March 2023, Grimsby Town became the first team in FA Cup history to beat five teams from higher divisions following a 2-1 win at Southampton to advance to the quarter finals.

Grimsby Town's relegation in 2010 made them the sixth club to compete in all top five divisions of English football (after Wimbledon, Wigan Athletic, Carlisle United, Oxford United and Luton Town, and before Leyton Orient, Notts County and Oldham Athletic). Grimsby's 1939 FA Cup semi-final attendance of 76,962 versus Wolverhampton Wanderers is still a record at Manchester United's Old Trafford stadium. In 1954 they became the first English club to appoint a foreign manager, Hungarian Elemér Berkessy. The club's record appearance holder is John McDermott, who made 754 appearances between 1987 and 2007, while their leading scorer is Pat Glover, with 180 goals (1930–39).

History

Early years (1878–1918)

Grimsby Town was formed in 1878 after a meeting held at the Wellington Arms public house in Freeman Street, Grimsby. Several attendees included members of the local Worsley Cricket Club who wanted to form a football club to occupy the empty winter evenings after the cricket season had finished.

The club was originally called Grimsby Pelham, this being the family name of the Earl of Yarborough, a significant landowner in the area. In 1880 the club purchased land at Clee Park which was to become their ground until 1889 when they relocated to Abbey Park, before moving again in 1899 to their present home, Blundell Park. The original colours were blue and white hoops, which were changed to chocolate brown and blue quartered shirts in 1884.

In 1888 the club first played league football, joining the newly formed 'Combination'. The league soon collapsed and the following year the club applied to join the Football League, an application that was refused. Instead the club joined the Football Alliance. In 1890 the club became a limited company and in 1892 finally entered the Football League, when it was expanded to two divisions. The first game was a 2–1 victory over Northwich Victoria.

The 1901–02 season saw promotion to the First Division, having finished as champions; two seasons later they were relegated and within a decade they would be a non-League side again, failing re-election in 1910 and falling to the Midland League. However, they finished as champions at the first attempt and at the subsequent re-election vote, replaced local rivals Lincoln City in the Football League.

Grimsby Town and Hull City were the only two professional teams which had official permission to play league football on Christmas Day because of the demands of the fish trade, but that tradition has now disappeared following the dramatic reduction of their trawler fleets in recent years.

Inter-War years (1918–1945)
This was the most successful period in the club's history. The first full season after World War I the club were relegated to the new Third Division; in the initial 1920–21 season they played against the former members of the Southern League who had been invited to form the new division, but after a year an equivalent Third Division North was created and Grimsby moved across to that. By 1929 they were back in Division One, where they stayed (with a brief break from 1932 to 1934) until 1939, obtaining their highest-ever league position, 5th in Division One, in the 1934–35 season. In 1925 they adopted the black and white stripes as their colours.

Three Grimsby Town players, forward Jackie Bestall, goalkeeper George Tweedy and defender Harry Betmead each received a solitary England cap during the period 1935–1937. They remain the only players from the club to have received full England honours.

Grimsby reached the semi-final of the FA Cup in 1936, the game was played at Huddersfield Town's Leeds Road, but lost 1–0 to Arsenal, with the goal coming from Cliff Bastin five minutes before half time.

On 20 February 1937, the club's record attendance of 31,651 was recorded when the club met Wolverhampton Wanderers in the FA Cup.

Grimsby also reached the semi-final of the FA Cup on 25 March 1939, Grimsby played Wolverhampton Wanderers, in a FA Cup semi-final at Old Trafford. The attendance of 76,962 remains Old Trafford's largest ever attendance. The Mariners lost the game 5–0 after goalkeeper George Moulson was injured early in the match. With the rules forbidding substitutes for injuries, Grimsby had to play with 10 men and an outfield player in goal.

Post-war decline (1946–1970)

With the resumption of the Football League for the 1946–47 season after World War II the club was relegated at the end of the 1947–48 season and has never returned to the highest level. Much of the 1950s and 1960s were spent alternating between the Second Division and the Third Division North, later the Third Division. From July 1951 to January 1953 they were managed by Bill Shankly. His main problems were that Grimsby had been relegated twice in recent seasons, dropping from the First to the Third Division, and some good players had been transferred before he arrived. Shankly believed he still had good players to work with and was able to buy some additional players on the transfer market for low fees.

Grimsby made a strong challenge for promotion in 1951–52 but finished second, three points behind Lincoln City (only one team was promoted from Division Three North, with one from Division Three South).

Grimsby's aging team made a bright start in 1952–53 with five straight wins but eventually slipped and finished in 5th place. In 1953–54, Shankly became disillusioned when the board could not give him money to buy new players. He was reluctant to promote some promising reserves because of loyalty to the older players (a fault that was to resurface at Liverpool years later) and he finally resigned in January 1954, citing the board's lack of ambition as his main reason. Shankly's record in league football at Grimsby was 62 wins and 35 defeats from 118 matches. Shankly went on to win the Football League, FA Cup and UEFA Cup with Liverpool.

Grimsby became the first English football club to appoint a foreign manager with the appointment of Hungarian Elemér Berkessy in 1954. Shortly afterwards Allenby Chilton became Grimsby's first player-manager, he joined late in the 1954–55 season from Manchester United. However, Chilton was unable to stop Grimsby from being relegated. But the following season, Chilton led Grimsby to the Division Three North title – the only club ever to go from relegation to promotion in one season. Chilton continued as manager at Grimsby Town until April 1959 when he joined Wigan Athletic as manager for one season during 1960–61.

In 1968 Grimsby slipped into the Fourth Division for the first time. The following season the club had to apply for re-election to the league having finished second from bottom. It was in this season that the lowest-ever attendance for a Football League match at Blundell Park was ever recorded; 1,833 saw a 2–0 defeat to Brentford. Arthur Drewry, a local businessman, married the daughter of Grimsby Town's chairman, and subsequently served as a director of the club before his own chairmanship. Drewry became President of the Football League and Chairman of the Football Association after Grimsby, before he was elected as the 5th President of FIFA.

Revival of the 1970s (1970–1980)

Grimsby Town broke their transfer record in 1972 with a fee of £20,000 for the signing of Phil Hubbard. In the same year 22,489 people witnessed a home victory against Exeter City that saw the club promoted as Division Four Champions. This turnaround was credited to the appointment of Lawrie McMenemy as manager.

The club stayed in Division Three until relegation in 1977 but were promoted again in 1979. A year later they finished as Third Division Champions under the stewardship of George Kerr and returned to the second tier of the English game, a level they had not been at for 16 years.

A popular myth has it that in 1976 the local Member of Parliament and then Foreign Secretary Anthony Crosland invited the then United States Secretary of State Henry Kissinger to watch the Mariners play Gillingham. Despite this being widely reported in the media, with some outlets claiming Kissinger subsequently became a Grimsby fan, in reality Kissinger's Boeing 747 simply stopped off for a two-hour breakfast discussion with Crosland on the issue of Rhodesia at nearby RAF Waddington before flying directly to Nairobi. However, Crosland's decision to force the US foreign policy leader to fly from London to Lincolnshire for their Saturday morning meeting was influenced by his desire to stay in his constituency and watch his local football team.

Return to the Second Division (1980–1987)
The first season back (1980–81) saw the club finish 7th. Work started that year on a new £1 million stand, originally called the Findus Stand (now known as the Young's Stand) after the former Barrett's Stand had been declared unsafe, the stand opened for the first time on 29 August 1982, as the Mariners played hosts to Leeds United. In the 1983–84 season the club finished 5th in the Second Division after spending most of the latter part of the campaign in the top three promotion places. This was their highest league finish since the 1947–48 season. Grimsby Town's stay in the Second Division ended in 1987, having spent much of the 1986–87 season in the top half of the table, but a run of 8 losses and 2 draws in the final 10 games saw them fall from 8th to 21st.

Initial decline and double promotion (1987–1997)
1987–88 saw Grimsby Town suffer a second consecutive relegation, placing them in the Fourth Division. The club's financial situation was also dismal, and as the 1988–89 season began, the task at Grimsby was to avoid relegation to the Football Conference, avoid expulsion from the FA and avoid going out of business completely. This was achieved, finishing 9th. Following the resignation of Dave Booth in 1986 (to pursue outside business interests) the club had two managers in two years (Mick Lyons and Bobby Roberts). Alan Buckley was appointed after the 1988 relegation and by 1991 had led the club to two successive promotions with the chairman at that time being Peter Furneaux. Grimsby were to remain in football's second flight for six years. Buckley's crop of players consisting of some of the most popular and biggest cult heroes in the club's history; players such as Shaun Cunnington, Keith Alexander, Mark Lever, Dave Gilbert, Steve Livingstone, Paul Futcher, Paul Groves and Clive Mendonca made the club a solid second-tier side (the Second Division became Division One in 1992 upon the creation of the Premier League from the old First Division). In 1992–93, Grimsby finished 9th in the new Division One, and until well into April they were in the hunt for a play-off place that would have given them the chance of a third promotion in four years. They dipped to 16th place a year later, though they were never in any real danger of relegation.

The Mariners began to produce homegrown talent from the club's youth academy, including Jack Lester, John Oster, Gary Croft and Peter Handyside. Buckley departed Grimsby in October 1994 to join West Bromwich Albion and he was replaced by defender Brian Laws. Laws steered Grimsby to a 10th-place finish in his first season as manager. During his tenure, Laws became famous for a changing-room altercation after a defeat at Luton with Italian striker Ivano Bonetti, which left the latter with a fractured cheekbone, and caused the popular player to leave the club at the end of the season. Grimsby finished 17th and were in the battle to avoid relegation right up to the penultimate game of the season. In the 1996–97 season the Mariners were relegated from Division One. Despite flowing goals from Clive Mendonca, notably good performances from John Oster and newcomer Kingsley Black, Grimsby failed to save themselves. The club had suffered from the losses of Gary Croft, who made a £1.7 million move to Blackburn Rovers and ever present goalkeeper Paul Crichton.

Double Wembley season (1997–98)

The 1997–98 season saw the return of Alan Buckley as manager, after an unsuccessful period at West Bromwich Albion, for Grimsby Town's most successful post-war season. In the summer of 1997, Buckley succeeded in bringing in players to the club who were to be instrumental in the club's upcoming season; former skipper Paul Groves was re-signed from West Bromwich Albion, and Kevin Donovan and David Smith also joined the club from Albion. The mid-season capture of Huddersfield Town midfielder Wayne Burnett proved to be a great bit of business for Buckley. After a seemingly poor start to the League campaign, performances improved, which propelled the club into a promotion battle with Watford, Bristol City and an expensively assembled Fulham (at the time the only club at this level to have spent seven-figure sums on players), with Grimsby finishing the season in 3rd place.

A good run in the League Cup saw the Mariners knock holders Leicester City and fellow Premier League side Sheffield Wednesday out of the competition before finally losing out to Liverpool. A decent run of form had ignited the careers of such younger players as Daryl Clare, Danny Butterfield and Jack Lester who were becoming an integral part of the Blundell Park set-up. The Mariners went on to dump Burnley out of the Football League Trophy Northern section area final, which would see the club book its first trip to Wembley Stadium. The club were drawn against Southern section champions AFC Bournemouth and in a tight game, an equaliser from substitute Kingsley Black took the game into extra time, and in the 112th minute Grimsby secured the game courtesy of a golden goal from Wayne Burnett. This was the first major trophy awarded to the club following its first appearance at Wembley. It took only four weeks for Grimsby to return to the stadium though, this time to face Northampton Town in the Division Two play-off Final. Town won the game 1–0 thanks to a first half Kevin Donovan goal which gave the club a historic Wembley double and the Mariners promotion back to Division One.

Return to the second tier (1998–2003)
The 1998–99 season saw Grimsby Town finish in 11th place, but the 1999–2000 season saw Grimsby struggle and finish 20th, avoiding relegation at the expense of Buckley's old club Walsall. The 2000–01 season saw a boardroom change with Doug Everitt taking over from Bill Carr. Everitt dismissed manager Alan Buckley just two games into the season, replacing him with Lennie Lawrence, who earlier in his managerial career had guided both Charlton Athletic and Middlesbrough into the top flight. The new manager chopped and changed the playing squad around and brought in some expensive loan signings from abroad such as Zhang Enhua, Menno Willems signing from Vitesse for 160K, David Nielsen and Knut Anders Fostervold. Despite this, the club struggled to avoid relegation, only securing their place in Division One on the last day of the season with a win over promoted Fulham.

The Mariners started the 2001–02 season strongly, topping the league table after five games. The club advanced to the third round of the League Cup where they met holders Liverpool at Anfield. In one of the club most famous victories, Grimsby held the Premier League team to a 0–0 draw after 90 minutes taking the game into extra time. Despite Gary McAllister scoring a penalty following a David Beharall handball to put the Reds 1–0 up, loan signing Marlon Broomes equalised before ex-Everton youth player Phil Jevons hit a 35-yard strike into the top corner of Chris Kirkland's goal to give the club a historic victory. Grimsby's push for promotion faltered and the team's form declined rapidly, with Lawrence being dismissed halfway into the season. Paul Groves, the skipper, was chosen to replace him and he steered them to a 19th in the final table, enough to avoid relegation, but a disappointing end to a season which had begun so promisingly. The season was overshadowed by the collapse of ITV Digital putting enormous strain on finances for the club.

The 2002–03 season would bring relegation with the Mariners finishing bottom of Division One and relegated after five successive seasons at this level. At the time only one of their previous 12 seasons had been spent below the second tier of English football.

Sliding down the divisions (2004–2010)
The sudden collapse of ITV Digital had left the club with debts of over £2 million, £700,000 of which was owed to the Inland Revenue and a further substantial amount to their bankers, Lloyds Bank. The collapse had seen a lot of the smaller clubs playing in the second tier of English football struggle to make ends meet. Coupled with this, it meant first-team players such as Danny Coyne and Georges Santos moved on to other clubs. For the new season, the club also had to supply its own kits following the closure of long serving kit suppliers Avec Sportswear. Grimsby Town played the season using the brand "Grimsby Town Sports".

Groves was dismissed in February 2004 following a poor stretch of games that had seen the club drop down the table, his replacement Nicky Law was sacked himself only a few months later as Grimsby were relegated for a second consecutive season. Russell Slade was appointed as the new manager in May 2004.

In 2005, director John Fenty became the controlling shareholder in the club after a search for outside investors failed, and a sale of shares to the local public was poorly received. He owned a 51% majority stake in the club and had made significant loans to the club to ensure its continued operation. Former Leicester City chairman John Elsom also joined the board of directors along with racehorse stable trainer and owner Michael Chapman in December 2002.

Having guided Grimsby to a mid table finish in his first season, Russell Slade began the 2005–06 season with a good start to the season and much improved results and performances had seen Grimsby Town rise to the top of Football League Two. A good run in the League Cup saw Town beat Derby County away at Pride Park in round one, and defeat Premier League side Tottenham Hotspur at home in the second round, with Jean-Paul Kamudimba Kalala hitting an 87th-minute winner. The Mariners eventually suffered elimination by Newcastle United in the third round, losing 1–0 at home. Grimsby would fall out of the promotion places on the final day of the season and after defeating Lincoln City in the play-off semi-finals they would lose 1–0 to Cheltenham Town in the final at the Millennium Stadium. On 31 May, manager Russell Slade left the club after failing to agree terms on a new contract.

Slade's Assistant Graham Rodger was his replacement but by November he had been dismissed following a poor start to the season, he was replaced by Alan Buckley who arrived back with The Mariners for a third time but could only produce a bottom half finish in League Two. During the 2007–08 season the club enjoyed a good run in the Football League Trophy and on 4 March 2008 Grimsby booked their place at the new Wembley Stadium after beating Morecambe in a two-legged Northern Final. A Paul Bolland goal in the away first leg was enough to see Town through. They went on to play MK Dons in the Final on 30 March, losing 2–0 after Danny Boshell missed an early penalty. The season ended with eight straight defeats. After a 13–game winless streak in the league stretching from 22 March 2008, on 15 September 2008 Alan Buckley was sacked as manager for a second time. The board appointed Mike Newell as manager. The Mariners would finish 22nd in League Two narrowly avoiding relegation on the final day. 

Following another slow start to the season, and despite previous backings from the Grimsby Town board, on 18 October 2009 the club's official website declared they had sacked Mike Newell due to "irretrievable breakdown". Neil Woods was controversially made permanent manager on 23 November 2009. The other main candidate for the job was former boss Russell Slade, but the board decided upon Woods ahead of Slade. Almost immediately Woods was dealt a blow when the club decided to do a U-turn and sell captain Ryan Bennett to Peterborough United for £500,000 despite rejecting this offer in the summer and the player only recently signing a new four-year deal. Grimsby under Woods struggled and despite winning four and drawing one of their last six games to give them a chance of league survival going into the last game of the season., they were defeated 3–0 by Burton Albion, and thus were relegated from the Football League for the first time in nearly 100 years.

Non-league (2010–2016)
Neil Woods was relieved of his duties on 24 February 2011 after 15 months in charge, leaving the club in 9th position in the Conference National. On 23 March 2011, former Boston United managerial duo of Rob Scott and Paul Hurst were announced as the new joint managers. They finished the 2010–11 season in 11th on 62 points. On 19 September 2011, John Fenty resigned as chairman of Grimsby Town with immediate effect, a position he had held for 7 years.

Following an 11th place finish in 2012, the Mariners enjoyed a positive cup run in the 2012–13 season FA Trophy and reached the final at Wembley Stadium where they played Wrexham on 24 March 2013. Grimsby went ahead in the second half with 20 minutes left to go, through an Andy Cook strike. However, they conceded a penalty with 9 minutes left and Wrexham equalised. This took the game to extra time, and then penalties, where Grimsby lost the shoot-out 4–1. Grimsby finished the season in good form, with a 9-match unbeaten run, finishing the season with a 3–0 win against Newport County. This led them to finish in 4th place with 83 points. They faced Newport County again straight away in the play-off semi-finals, where they were knocked out by a 1–0 loss in both legs. The managerial duo was broken up on 6 September 2013 due to Rob Scott being suspended and Paul Hurst was placed in sole charge of the team.

Grimsby came third in the Conference Premier 2014–15 season, and secured a play-off spot. Grimsby reached the 2015 Conference Premier play-off Final against Bristol Rovers in front of a Conference record 47,029 crowd at Wembley Stadium. The game was forced to penalties where Jon-Paul Pittman missed the penultimate penalty in their 5–3 shootout.

Grimsby would play in the final of the FA Trophy, but lost 1–0 to FC Halifax Town. The week before, Grimsby Town beat Forest Green Rovers 3–1 in the 2016 National League play-off Final at Wembley Stadium, seeing Grimsby promoted back to League Two after a six-year absence from the Football League.

Return to the Football League (2016–2021)
After promotion, manager, Paul Hurst, released a number of players, many of whom were pivotal to the previous season's promotion push. On 24 October 2016, Paul Hurst was appointed as Shrewsbury Town manager, Chris Doig also left Grimsby and made Hurst's assistant at Shrewsbury, thus leaving Dave Moore and Stuart Watkiss as caretaker managers. On 7 November 2016, Marcus Bignot, then manager of non-League side, Solihull Moors, was officially announced as the new Grimsby Town manager, along with the appointment of Micky Moore as his assistant. On 10 April 2017, Marcus Bignot was sacked. His replacement was Russell Slade, who joined the club for the second time as manager on 12 April 2017. The Mariners would finish 14th, with a total of 62 points. 

Slade was sacked on 11 February 2018 after the team failed to win in 12 league games, with eight losses; he left the team 17th in League Two. Paul Wilkinson took over as caretaker manager following the sacking. Michael Jolley was appointed as the new manager on 2 March 2018 and twice secured Grimsby's Football League status as well as securing cup runs that culminated in an FA Cup tie away at Crystal Palace and a League Cup tie at Chelsea. Jolley left the club by mutual agreement and was replaced on a temporary basis by assistant manager Anthony Limbrick.

On 29 December 2019, Ian Holloway joined Grimsby Town as manager, at the same time becoming a shareholder in the club. On 23 December 2020, just under one year later, Holloway left the club abruptly in controversial circumstances, announcing on Twitter that he was resigning with immediate effect. His decision was down to several boardroom issues, a big loss in form and his unwillingness to work with a consortium looking to buy out John Fenty. Ben Davies was caretaker manager for two games.

On 30 December 2020, Paul Hurst was re-appointed as permanent manager, but could not prevent the club from being relegated back to the National League following a 3–2 defeat to Exeter City, after a five-year stay in the Football League.

New takeover (2021–)

On 5 May 2021, local businessmen Jason Stockwood and Andrew Pettit under their company 1878 Partners completed their takeover of the football club after buying out majority shareholder John Fenty.

In the 2021–22 season, Grimsby finished 6th in the National League. They defeated Notts County in the quarter-final of the play-offs, and Wrexham in the semi-final 5–4. In the 2022 National League play-off Final, they defeated Solihull Moors 2–1 after extra time to win promotion back to League Two at the London Stadium.

On 1 March 2023, Grimsby advanced to the quarter finals of the FA Cup for the first time since 1939 by beating Premier League side Southampton 2-1 away from home, becoming the first club in the competition's history to knock out five teams from a higher division.

Colours and strip

The original 1878 kit of Grimsby Pelham, featured a shirt with narrow horizontal stripes in royal blue and white, with long white shorts and black socks. Between 1884 and 1910, various kit colours were introduced, with the most common colours being variations of pale blue and chocolate brown, worn with white shorts and black socks. Other kits from this period include:

1897–1898 – Plain white shirt, with royal blue shorts and socks
1904–1906 – Pale red shirt, with black shorts and socks
1906–1908 – White shirt with red collar and cuffs, red shorts, black socks with red bands

Black and white vertical stripes were adopted in 1910 and with a few exceptions, they have rarely been missing from the kit design ever since and have become one of the most recognisable features of the club. The 1911 kit included the black and white striped t-shirt, white shorts and black socks.  Exceptions from the traditional bar-stripe kit:

1935–1936 – Plain white shirt featuring the coat of arms of the County Borough of Great Grimsby, black shorts and red socks
1958–1959 – White shirt with black pin stripes, black shorts, red socks
1960–1962 – White shirt with black collar and cuffs, red shorts, red socks
1963–1966 – White shirt with black pin stripes, black shorts with white stripe, white socks with black bands
2006–2007 – Black and white halves, black shorts, black socks

Since the introduction of the black and white bar stripes in 1910, the GTFC kits have featured exclusively red, black and white. The only exceptions to this are the corporate colours used in a sponsor logo and the yellow/gold trim used between 2001 and 2003. The official GTFC club logo first appeared on the club kit in 1974.

Stadium

Grimsby Town play their home games at Blundell Park in Cleethorpes. This is the club's fourth stadium. They originally played at Clee Park until 1879, they then moved to Lovett Street for a single season, before returning to Clee Park for a further nine years. The Mariners then moved to Abbey Park until 1899 before a move to Blundell Park, the club's current stadium.

In 1953 the club introduced its first floodlights to the ground and with that enabling Grimsby Town to play night-time fixtures. Tall floodlights were purchased second hand from Wolverhampton Wanderers in 1958 and installed in 1960 at a cost of £9,000 which was raised by the supporters club, they have illuminated matches ever since when required. However, in 2019, these original lights were replaced with newer, brighter lights. Three of the four original pylons remain.  The stadium has had an all-seated capacity of just under 10,000 in recent years, being in and around 27,000 before the stadium was made all seated in 1995. The club's demise from the second tier of English football, down to the fourth meant the expansion seating was removed. This brought the overall capacity down from around 12,000 to what it is today. Situated inside the Findus Stand at Blundell Park, is "McMenemy's Function Suite", named after former manager Lawrie McMenemy.

Since the late 1990s, there have been plans for a new 20,200-seat stadium at nearby Great Coates – tentatively titled the Conoco Stadium after a naming rights deal with the American energy corporation ConocoPhillips. There have been numerous delays to the development of the new stadium. The plans have been met with resistance from many residents of the local area surrounding the proposed stadium site, but other factors have also slowed progress. One of the most notable difficulties for the club was in demonstrating how it planned to finance the scheme. As a result, they later amended their proposal to include a retail park on the site, which would help to fund the development. This raised other problems, due to a rival proposal by the property developer Henry Boot, who are continuing with plans for their own retail park, which will be in direct competition with the Grimsby Town site and which has also been approved by the local council. Henry Boot attempted to have the football team's development plan stopped, by asking for it to be sent for judicial review by the Government, however their attempt failed. Currently, the Grimsby Town stadium development proposal has satisfied all the conditions that were imposed by planning officials and consent for the project has been granted. Initial estimates had suggested that the club would be able to move to the new stadium for the start of the 2011–12 season. However, as a result of the ongoing global recession, the club has halted all progress on the new development and it is unlikely that any work will begin until an upturn in the economy.

As of the 2012–13 season, the GTFC Supporters Trust known as the 'Mariners Trust' has taken over responsibility for the operation of most of the bars at the stadium, which hopefully will lead to refurbishment, and new ideas from fans as to how the bars operate.

Plans were underway to relocate the club to land at the side of the Peaks Parkway in Grimsby. As of 2020, new plans have been agreed with the council, Grimsby Town FC and The Freemen of Grimsby to build the stadium on recently cleared land off Freeman Street.

Rivalries

Grimsby Town's geographical region pits them against three main professional rivals, two of which like Grimsby are from the former county of Humberside. Hull City, on the north bank of the Humber Estuary have traditionally been viewed as Grimsby's main rival but a contrast in their recent fortunes has meant that the two clubs have not met in the League since 1987, prior to a 2020 EFL Trophy victory for Hull the clubs had last met in 1997 when The Mariners won 1-0 in the same competition. The closest football club to Grimsby are Scunthorpe United, The Iron are mainly regarded as Town's biggest rival although historically Scunthorpe have played most of their football in divisions below The Mariners. In the mid 2000s Grimsby's fall from the second tier to the fourth was followed closely with Scunthorpe earning several promotions, with the 2004–05 season being the only campaign both sides met in the same division before being reunited once more in 2019. Games involving any of the former Humberside clubs are known as the Humber derby.

In more recent times games against Lincoln City (a Lincolnshire derby) has been Grimsby's primary derby game, although historically Lincoln are another local side who have predominantly spent a lot of time in lower divisions to the ones Grimsby have regularly featured in, Town's relegation to League Two in 2004 renewed this rivalry with notable games being the play-off semi-final in 2006 in which Grimsby ran out 3–1 winners on aggregate. In a contrast to Mariners fans regarding Scunthorpe as their main rival, supporters of Lincoln City would regard Grimsby as theirs. A slight rivalry with Sheffield Wednesday intensified between 2000 and 2004, with the two clubs competing with each other in relegation battles over four seasons in both the First and Second Division but the clubs have not met since this period. Barnsley, Doncaster Rovers and Boston United are three other examples of clubs who have shared some kind of rivalry with Grimsby in past seasons, whilst they were in the second and fourth tiers respectively. There are two other clubs within the Borough of Grimsby who are on the football ladder, Grimsby Borough and Cleethorpes Town, coupled with other Non-League sides in Lincolnshire such as Gainsborough Trinity, games with these clubs only form pre-season friendlies or fixtures in the Lincolnshire Senior Cup.

Mascot
The Mighty Mariner is Grimsby Town's mascot. He wears the club's home strip and normally parades in front of the Pontoon Stand as well as tormenting the opposition's fans. He also plays football with the mascots and warms up the Grimsby Town fans. Up until 1998, there were two club mascots, Mighty and Mini Mariner, and until then they used to wear yellow fishing rain coats, before Mini was dropped, and Mighty was given the home strip to wear. Formerly, the mascot was a character named "Harry Haddock", so-called after Grimsby's fishing industry, who is actually a rainbow trout.

Supporters
The newly rebranded Mariners Trust has been working with the fans and the club on a number of projects and events with the aim of improving the match day experience for the fans. It has a new Junior Mariners section, works with similar GTFC-friendly organisations like the internet mariners and the PPAG and is run by volunteers of 400+ members and continues to encourage GTFC fans to join and get involved. Since the late 1990s Grimsby Town have had a Scandinavian supporters group based in Norway and Sweden. Mariners fans since 2006 have also had a friendship with the supporters of Belgian club Eendracht Aalst.

Actor and comedian Sacha Baron Cohen who is most widely known for creating and portraying the characters Ali G and Borat was spotted at Grimsby Town's home game against Cambridge United during the 2013–14 season. He watched The Mariners 1–0 defeat before talking to fans in the Blundell Hotel dressed in a Grimsby shirt and hat. Cohen had been in the town to think of ideas for a new film and had also visited the town's fish docks. In December 2013 it was announced that Cohen would be appearing in a new film called Grimsby. Notable Mariners fans include Soccer AM presenter and comedian Lloyd Griffith, American actor and television presenter Adam Richman. Despite not being from Grimsby or England, the Man v. Food presenter said he is a supporter of the club, and was involved in a BBC Radio 5 Live phone-in before the 2013 FA Trophy final between Grimsby and Wrexham. In 2015 Richman contributed to a fan fundraiser "Operation Promotion" and in June 2020 became a club shareholder.

Grimsby-born actor Thomas Turgoose, who starred as the lead role character Shaun Fields in the drama film This Is England and the TV follow-up's This Is England '86, This Is England '88 and This Is England '90, is a season ticket holder. He appeared as a guest on Sky show Soccer AM in 2007 sporting a Grimsby Town shirt.

Other famous fans include politician Norman Lamont, former professional snooker players Mike Hallett and Dean Reynolds, singer and songwriter Ella Henderson and BBC weather presenter Keeley Donovan.

Grimsby Town in popular culture
In April 2007, it was announced that Grimsby Town had struck a deal with Sky channel Propeller TV to show four 30-minute shows named GTTV. The show mainly focused on player and staff interviews and, match reviews. After the first four shows had aired, the project was eventually scrapped.

Grimsby Town has popped up in two British films, being mentioned as one of Mike Bassett's former clubs in Mike Bassett: England Manager as well as the film ID.

Grimsby is the football club that Sacha Baron Cohen's character Nobby supports in the 2016 action comedy film Grimsby.

Grimsby's 4-5 victory away at Wrexham in the National League play-off semi-final is the main feature of Season 1, Episode 18 of the documentary Welcome to Wrexham which follows the purchase of Wrexham by Hollywood actors Ryan Reynolds and Rob McElhenney. The episode features a segment about the club and an interview with Grimsby chairman Jason Stockwood.

Grimsby Town Women 
In 2019, it was announced that Grimsby Town would enter the world of female football with the launch of its first ever affiliated women's team. The 2019/20 season saw the team venture into the Lincolnshire Women's League for the very first time led by newly appointed manager Dale Houlston. This was the 7th tier of the women's football pyramid, the very bottom rung of the ladder.

In a season that was cut short in March 2020 because of the Covid-19 pandemic, Grimsby Town Women remained undefeated, winning every competitive game that they played. They were just two games away from certain promotion when the season was cut short, as well as reaching the League Cup Final and the Lincolnshire Women's County Cup Final. None of those Cup Finals took place because of the Covid-19 pandemic.

During the summer of 2020, the FA announced that following a restructure to the leagues, Grimsby Town Women would be promoted to the 6th tier of the women's football pyramid, meaning that the team commenced the 2020/21 season in the East Midlands Women's Regional Football League, Division 1 North. The 2020/21 season also saw Grimsby Town Women enter The FA Women's Cup for the very first time.

Grimsby Town Women commenced the 2021/22 season very strongly and led the league as strong favourites to gain promotion once again. In November of this season, manager Dale Houlston inexplicably resigned his position, having played 7 games, winning 6 and drawing just 1. Their dominance in the division at this time saw them score 30 goals in just 7 games, conceding just once. It was a mystery why Houlston felt the need to resign, given that he was such a enthusiastic ambassador for women's game, and had done so much to champion the formation of women's football at the club.

Players

First-team squad

Out on loan

Academy squad

Women's team

Players of the season
As voted for by supporters of the club.

Top goal scorers (season)

*Current season

Club officials

Board and management officials

Coaching staff and support staff

Managerial history

Managers

Assistant managers

Chairman

Notable former players and managers

Notable players and managers

Top flight players
The following players have played in a major top flight league and have moved to Grimsby Town later in their career.

 Bradley Allen
 Darren Barnard
 Peter Beagrie
 Dave Beasant
 David Beharall
 Garry Birtles
 Kingsley Black
 Ivano Bonetti
 Marlon Broomes
 Wayne Burnett
 Peter Butler
 Stuart Campbell
 Marcel Cas
 Steve Chettle
 Nick Colgan
 Danny Collins
 Terry Cooke
 Gary Crosby
 Aidan Davison
 Willie Falconer
 Jamie Forrester
 Enzo Gambaro
 Dean Gordon
 Elliot Grandin
 Des Hamilton
 Bryan Hughes
 Simeon Jackson
 Michael Jeffrey
 Nigel Jemson
 Phil Jevons
 Jean-Paul Kalala
 Jake Kean
 Jamie Lawrence
 Brian Laws
 Jason Lee
 Steve Livingstone
 Clint Marcelle
 Gary McSheffrey
 Alan Neilson
 Mark Nicholls
 David Nielsen
 Ludvig Öhman
 Martin Pringle
 Isaiah Rankin
 Michael Reddy
 Paul Robinson
 Steve Slade
 David Smith
 Richard Smith
 Robbie Stockdale
 Andy Todd
 Paul Warhurst
 Vance Warner
 Neil Webb
 John Welsh
 Tommy Widdrington
 Menno Willems
 Curtis Woodhouse
 Zhang Enhua

The following players have gone on to play top flight football in a major league after first playing with Grimsby Town.

 Ryan Bennett
 Omar Bogle
 Michael Boulding
 Danny Butterfield
 Danny Coyne
 Siriki Dembele
 Gary Croft
 Akin Famewo
 Simon Francis
 Dean Henderson
 Richard Hughes
 Charlie I'Anson
 Steve Kabba
 Shay Logan
 Clive Mendonca
 John Oster
 Martin Paterson
 Nicky Southall
 Easah Suliman
 John Thorrington
 Conor Townsend
 Paul Trollope
 Paul Wilkinson

International Players
Players signed to, and have played for Grimsby Town that have had full international caps during their careers.

|-
|valign="top"|
Antigua and Barbuda
 Rhys Browne

Australia
 Nick Rizzo

Barbados
 Louie Soares

Canada
 Simeon Jackson

Cape Verde Islands
 Georges Santos

China
 Zhang Enhua

Congo DR
 Jean-Paul Kalala
 Aristote Nsiala

England
 Joseph Bache
 Dave Beasant
 Jackie Bestall
 Harry Betmead
 Garry Birtles
 Allenby Chilton
 Tom Galley
 Tommy Gardner
 Dean Henderson
 George Tweedy
 Neil Webb
 Trevor Whymark

Grenada
 Anthony Straker

Guadeloupe
 Mickaël Antoine-Curier

|width="33"| 
|valign="top"|
Ghana
 Will Antwi

Guinea-Bissau
 Arnaud Mendy

Hong Kong
 Charlie Wright

Ireland (IFA) (1882–1950)
 Billy Andrews
 Harry Baird
 Jackie Coulter
 Peter Doherty
 Allan Elleman
 Jimmy McStay

Jamaica
 Simon Ford
 Joel Grant
 Jamie Lawrence

Montserrat
 Junior Mendes
 Brandon Comley
New Zealand
 Jason Batty
 Max Crocombe
 Dave Mulligan

Northern Ireland
 Kingsley Black
 Aidan Davison
 Stuart Elliott
 Alan Fettis
 Josh Magennis
 Chris Nicholl
 Martin Paterson
 Jackie Scott
 Ciarán Toner

|width="33"| 
|valign="top"|
Nigeria
 Chima Okorie

Republic of Ireland
 Nick Colgan
 Don Donovan
 Terry Donovan
 Wayne Henderson
 Pat Johnston
 Jimmy McStay
 George Moulson
 Joe Waters

Saint Kitts and Nevis
 Des Hazel

Saint Lucia
 Keith Alexander

Scotland
 David Black
 Mick Cullen
 Paul Dixon
 Hughie Gallacher
 Dave Gardner
 Richard Hughes
 James Lundie
 Robbie Stockdale

Sierra Leone
 Malvin Kamara

South Africa
 Mike Rowbotham

Sweden
 Martin Pringle

|width="33"| 
|valign="top"|
Trinidad & Tobago
 Clint Marcelle

Tunisia
 Idris El Mizouni
 Bilel Mohsni

United States of America
 John Thorrington

Wales
 Darren Barnard
 Thomas Chapman
 Dai Collier
 Danny Collins
 Danny Coyne
 David Felgate
 Pat Glover
 Chris Llewellyn
 Hugh Morris
 Dickie Morris
 Alan Neilson
 Lee Nogan
 John Oster
 Tony Rees
 Ian Walsh
 George Williams

PFA Team of the Year
The following have been included in the PFA Team of the Year whilst playing for Grimsby Town :
 1979  Kevin Moore &  Joe Waters
 1980  Kevin Moore &  Joe Waters
 1985  Paul Wilkinson
 1998  Kevin Donovan
 1998  Paul Groves
 2006  Michael Reddy

PFA Fans' Favourites
The following was included as the favourite Grimsby Town player in the a survey published by the Professional Footballers' Association in December 2007.
 Matt Tees

BBC Sports Cult Heroes
The following were chosen by fans as the favourite club heroes in the BBC Sports Cult Heroes poll in 2006.
  Clive Mendonca
  John McDermott
  Ivano Bonetti

Honours

First Division/Second Division/EFL Championship  (second tier)
Winners (2): 1898–99, 1933–34
Runners-up (1): 1928–29
Third place (2): 1895–96, 1896–97
Second Division/Third Division/EFL League One (third tier)
Winners (1): 1979–90
Runners-up (1): 1961–62
Third place (1): 1990–91
Play-off winners (1): 1997–98
Football League Third Division North (third tier)
Winners (2): 1925–26, 1955–56
Runners-up (1): 1951–52
Third place (1): 1921–22
Football League Fourth Division/Football League Third Division/EFL League Two (fourth tier)
Winners (1): 1971–72
Runners-up (2): 1978–79, 1989–90
Play-off runners-up (1): 2005–06
Conference National/National League (fifth tier)
Play-off winners (2): 2015–16, 2021–22
Play-off runners-up (1): 2014–15
Midland League (historic non-league)
Winners (5): 1910–11, 1930–31, 1931–32, 1933–34, 1946–47
Football League Trophy/EFL Trophy
Winners (1): 1997–98
Runners-up (1): 2007–08
Football League Group Cup
Winners (1): 1981–82
FA Trophy
Runners-up (2): 2012–13, 2015–16
Lincolnshire Senior Cup
Winners (39): 1885–86, 1888–89, 1896–97, 1898–99, 1899–1900, 1900–01, 1901–02, 1902–03, 1905–06, 1908–09, 1912–13, 1920–21, 1922–23, 1924–25, 1928–29, 1929–30, 1932–33, 1935–36, 1936–37, 1937–38, 1946–47, 1949–50, 1952–53, 1967–68, 1972–73, 1975–76, 1979–80, 1983–84, 1986–87, 1989–90, 1991–92, 1992–93, 1993–94, 1994–95, 1995–96, 1999–2000, 2011–12, 2012–13, 2014–15
Runners-up (25): 1886–87, 1909–10, 1910–11, 1911–12, 1914–15, 1919–20, 1923–24, 1930–31, 1931–32, 1933–34, 1934–35, 1945–46, 1947–48, 1948–49, 1950–51, 1953–54, 1957–58, 1960–61, 1970–71, 1974–75, 1990–91, 1996–97, 2003–04, 2008–09, 2010–11
Midland Youth Cup
Winners (2): 2005–06, 2009–10
Puma Youth Alliance League Cup
Winners (1): 2008–09

Seasons

Club records
More clubs have lost their managers after meeting Grimsby Town than after playing any other club.

Games
Biggest League Attendance: 26,605 v Stockport County on 11 April 1952
Biggest FA Cup Attendance: 31,651 v Wolverhampton Wanderers on 20 February 1937
Biggest League Cup Attendance: 23,115 v Wolverhampton Wanderers on 4 December 1979
Biggest Neutral Venue Attendance: 76,972 v Wolverhampton Wanderers on 25 March 1939 in the FA Cup semi final at Old Trafford, Manchester
Smallest League Attendance: 1,833 v Brentford on 3 May 1969
Smallest Cup Attendance: 248 v Sunderland U23's in Football League Trophy on 8 November 2017
Highest League Gate Receipts: £81,200 v Newcastle United on 4 May 1993
Highest FA Cup Gate Receipts: £119,799 v Aston Villa on 4 January 1994
Highest League Cup Gate Receipts: £97,000 v Tottenham Hotspur on 29 October 1991
Smallest League Gate Receipts: £32 v Glossop on 13 April 1907
Biggest League Home Win: 8–0 v Tranmere Rovers on 4 September 1925
Biggest League Away Win 7–0 v Bristol Rovers on 14 December 1957
Biggest League Home Defeat 0–7 v Manchester United on 26 December 1899
Biggest League Away Defeat 1–9 v Arsenal on 28 January 1931
Biggest League Home Draw 5–5 v Preston North End on 15 October 1932 and v Charlton Athletic on 7 January 1933
Biggest League Away Draw 4–4 v Lincoln City on 3 September 1958, v Chesterfield on 27 March 2004 and v Eastleigh on 15 May 2022.
Biggest Cup Home Win: 8–0 v Darlington on 21 November 1885
Biggest Cup Away Win: 8–1 v Croydon Common on 18 January 1911
Biggest Cup Defeat: 1–8 v Phoenix Bessemer on 25 November 1882
Biggest Cup Draw 5–5 v Fulham on 9 January 1954
Highest Scoring Game: 9–2 win over Darwen on 15 April 1899 and 6–5 win over Burnley on 29 October 2002
Biggest League Defeat: 1–9 v Arsenal on 28 January 1931
Seasons spent at Level 1 of the football league system: 12
Seasons spent at Level 2 of the football league system: 55
Seasons spent at Level 3 of the football league system: 28
Seasons spent at Level 4 of the football league system: 19
Seasons spent at Level 5 of the football league system:  7

Player records
Most League Goals In A Season: 42 by Pat Glover (1933–34)
Most League Goals in Total: 180 by Pat Glover (1930–39)
Most League Appearances: 647 by John McDermott from between 1987 and 2007
Most Appearances (all competitions): 754 by John McDermott from between 1987 and 2007
Most Capped Player While at Club: 7 by Pat Glover playing for Wales
Most Capped Player: 68 by Zhang Enhua playing for China
Highest Transfer Fee Paid: £550,000 to Preston North End for Lee Ashcroft on 11 August 1998
Highest Transfer Fee Received: £1.5 million rising to £2 million from Everton for John Oster on 1 August 1997
Longest Serving Current Player: Harry Clifton since August 2015.
Youngest Player: Louis Boyd, 15 years and 324 days, v Harrogate Town on 8 September 2020.
Oldest Player: Peter Beagrie, 40 years and 322 days, v Hartlepool United on 26 September 2006.
Youngest Goalscorer: Louis Boyd, 15 years and 324 days, v Harrogate Town on 8 September 2020.

References

Further reading

External links

Official websites
Grimsby Town Football Club website
Official website for McMenemys Function Suite
News sites
Grimsby Telegraph

Grimsby Town news from Sky Sports
Cod Almighty
The Fishy
Supporters' trust
The Mariners Trust; Grimsby Town FC supporters organisation

 
Sport in Grimsby
Borough of North East Lincolnshire
Football clubs in Lincolnshire
1878 establishments in England
Football clubs in England
National League (English football) clubs
English Football League clubs
EFL Trophy winners
Association football clubs established in 1878